The Luis Vallejo Bonsai Museum is a public access museum located in Alcobendas, Madrid, Spain, dedicated to the display and study of the art of bonsai. The museum was opened in 1995 and is one of the most important in Europe in its class. The museum presents the personal collection of Luis Vallejo as well as specimens donated by others. The collection is widely considered one of the best outside Japan, with multiple trees having received important awards in Spanish and international competitions.

The museum has a collection of over 300 specimens, with both native and imported species. Most of the trees in the collection have been designed and developed as bonsai by Luis Vallejo and Japanese bonsai masters, such as Hiroshi Takeyama, Saburo Kato, Shinji Suzuki and Masahiko Kimura.

History 
Luis Vallejo García-Mauriño is an internationally renowned landscape architect, his work includes the gardens of the Royal Mansour Marrakech hotel, the Oman Botanic Garden, the Madrid headquarters of the Santander Financial Group, as well as multiple public and private projects around the world. Vallejo's interest in bonsai began through his father, Francisco. According to Vallejo, his father, landscaper and plant nursery owner, used to acquire books related to his work in his trips, including some on bonsai and Japanese gardens purchased in New York City. The young Luis, who was 14 or 15 years at the time, was mesmerized by this artform, comparing it to "magic": miniature trees and forests, similar to those in nature, planted in small containers and being displayed as works of art.

Vallejo learned the techniques and aesthetics of bonsai by self study and by practicing in his father's nursery. Later on he had the opportunity to travel to Japan and meet some of the great Japanese bonsai artists. By observing and sharing with these experts, Vallejo expanded his expertise, even though he never received a formal education on the subject.

In the 80s, Vallejo organized his first bonsai exhibition, for what was at the time a widely unknown art in Spain, at the Royal Botanical Garden in Madrid. For the show, Vallejo used his own trees as well as others borrowed from early bonsai enthusiasts.

Between 1987 and 1994, Vallejo created, curated and maintained the personal bonsai collection of Spanish Prime Minister Felipe González, a great enthusiast and collector. Years later, González donated his collection to the Spanish National Research Council (Consejo Superior de Investigaciones Científicas (CSIC)). The collection is on display at the Royal Botanical Garden in Madrid.

In 1995 Vallejo opened the Luis Vallejo Bonsai Museum in Alcobendas, in partnership with that Municipality. The museum was designed by Vallejo with the assistance of the architect Antón Dávila in the Japanese style, including a koi pond.

From its inception, the museum has been visited by Japanese Ambassadors, members of the Japanese community in Spain, authorities from Alcobendas and other personalities. Luis Vallejo was awarded in 2008 the Order of the Rising Sun by the Japanese Emperor, Akihito, for his help in spreading the Japanese culture.

The Collection 

The museum bonsai collection has over 300 specimens, including native and imported species, and is widely considered among the best in the world outside of Japan. Not all specimens are on display, as the museum has private work and nursery areas for the development and care of the trees. Some of the specimens in the collection exceed the 200 years of age.

Among the species represented in the museum are:

Activities 

Besides the permanent display of its collection, the museum publishes books and spreads the art of bonsai by conducting seminars, classes, conferences and professional workshops and demonstrations.

The museum also organizes national bonsai shows and competitions in partnership with the Municipality of Alcobendas, the Japanese Embassy, and Spanish governmental agencies in charge of cultural development. These competitions are open to professionals and bonsai aficionados; quality awards are presented to the best trees.

References 

Bonsai
Museums in Madrid